Alberto Melis (born 18 January 1993) is an Italian football midfielder who plays for Aprilia in the Lega Pro Seconda Divisione.

Domestic League Records

External links

Italian footballers
1993 births
Living people
Association football midfielders
Savona F.B.C. players
Pisa S.C. players